Gli ( 2004 – 7 November 2020) was a Turkish European Shorthair cat from Istanbul best known for living in the Hagia Sophia, for which she became an Internet celebrity, grabbing the attention of visiting tourists. Gli was born in 2004 and was raised at Hagia Sophia. She gained significant media attention when the Hagia Sophia was re-opened to worship in 2020. 

Gli died on 7 November 2020, after receiving treatment in a veterinary clinic in Levent, Istanbul, since 24 September. It was announced that she would be buried in the premises of the Hagia Sophia. The Instagram account @hagiasophiacat was dedicated to Gli and was followed by more than 118,000 people at the time of her death.

Life 
Gli was born at Hagia Sophia in 2004, and she had 2 siblings, Pati and Kızım (which means 'Paw' and 'My Daughter' in English). Gli was loved by the tourists who visited Hagia Sophia, which was a museum at the time, and she became a symbol of Hagia Sophia. Gli was first popular when Barack Obama visited Hagia Sophia in 2009, he and Recep Tayyip Erdoğan stroked Gli. After it was told that Hagia Sophia was re-opening to worship, Gli was posted all over social media and became famous again. After the news of Hagia Sophia re-opening for worship, Gli's fate was on the news as well. Presidential spokesman İbrahim Kalın, made a statement: "That cat has become very famous, and there are others who haven’t become that famous yet. That cat will be there, and all cats are welcome to our mosques."

Gli died in 2020 at veterinary clinic in Levent, after she had received treatment since 24 September, according to Istanbul Governor Ali Yerlikaya.

References

Further reading

External links 

 

2004 animal births
2020 animal deaths
Individual cats
Cats in popular culture
Culture in Istanbul
Turkish Internet celebrities
Individual animals in Turkey
Cats in Turkey